is a former Japanese football player.

Playing career
Yoshino was born in Kanagawa Prefecture on July 9, 1980. After graduating from high school, he joined J1 League club Urawa Reds in 1999. He played as offensive midfielder from first season. However he could hardly play in the match from 2001. In May 2002, he moved to J2 League club Shonan Bellmare. He became a regular player and played many matches. In 2006, he moved to Yokohama FC. He played many matches and the club won the champions in 2006 and was promoted to J1 from 2007. However his opportunity to play decreased in 2007. In 2008, he moved to Japan Football League club Gainare Tottori. He played many matches as regular player. In 2010, although he could not play many matches for injury, the club won the champions and was promoted to J2 from 2011. However he could not play many matches for injuries and retired end of 2013 season.

Club statistics

References

External links

1980 births
Living people
Association football people from Kanagawa Prefecture
Japanese footballers
J1 League players
J2 League players
Japan Football League players
Urawa Red Diamonds players
Shonan Bellmare players
Yokohama FC players
Gainare Tottori players
Association football midfielders